Clayton is a city in Rabun County, Georgia, United States. Its population was 2,003 at the 2020 census.  The county seat of Rabun County, it is in the Blue Ridge Mountains.

History
The area that eventually became Clayton was called the Dividings because it sat at the intersection of three important Cherokee people trails. Explorer and naturalist William Bartram came through the Dividings in May 1775 while exploring what was later organized as Rabun County. Much later, after Clayton had grown to include the Dividings, two of the old Cherokee trails were improved as the main roads for Clayton and the county: U.S. 23/441 and U.S. 76.

Claytonsville was founded by European-American settlers in 1821 as the seat of Rabun County. In 1823, the town was incorporated and renamed Clayton. It was named after a prominent jurist and congressman, Judge Augustin S. Clayton, who served in both the Georgia House of Representatives and Georgia Senate before being elected as a US Representative from Georgia, serving two terms from 1831–1835.

In 1824,  were purchased from Solomon Beck for $150, and city representatives laid out a site for a courthouse and the surrounding streets.

In 1904, the Tallulah Falls Railway was completed to Clayton from Cornelia, Georgia; it was extended to Franklin, North Carolina by 1907. Clayton has had public water and sanitary sewer service since the 1920s. Initially, the water supply was two springs on nearby Buzzard Roost Mountain; today it uses Lake Rabun as its water supply.

In 1936, Clayton recorded  of snowfall, the highest annual total for anywhere in Georgia. 

Part of Disney's Old Yeller was shot in Clayton in 1957. Grizzly was filmed on location in Clayton with many residents cast in supporting roles. Production began the week before Thanksgiving 1975 with shooting continuing for about six weeks. After release in May 1976, "Grizzly" became the most financially successful independent motion picture to date—a record it held for more than two years until John Carpenter's "Halloween" hit theaters in October 1978.

Much of William Gibson's 2014 novel The Peripheral is set in Clayton in the not-too-distant future.

Geography
Clayton is at  (34.877788, -83.401691), at the southern base of 3,640-foot Black Rock Mountain. Immediately to its east is 3,000-foot Screamer Mountain. Other Blue Ridge Mountain peaks between 2,500 and 3,500 feet surround the city.

Climate

Government
Clayton is governed by a mayor and a five-member city council.

As of 2021, the mayor is Jordan Green, and the councilmembers are Michele Duquette, Ara Joyce, David Cross, Woody Blalock, and John Bradshaw.

The City Manager is Michael Esposito.

Demographics

As of the 2010 United States Census, there were 2,047 people living in the city. The racial makeup of the city was 74.5% White, 1.4% Black, 0.5% Native American, 0.7% Asian, 0.3% from some other race and 1.9% from two or more races. 20.8% were Hispanic or Latino of any race.

As of the census of 2000, there were 2,019 people, 816 households, and 497 families living in the city. The racial makeup of the city was 84.55% White, 2.77% African American, 0.89% Native American, 1.34% Asian, 0.15% Pacific Islander, 9.41% from other races, and 0.89% from two or more races. Hispanic or Latino of any race were 14.71% of the population.

There were 816 households, out of which 22.7% had children under the age of 18 living with them, 44.7% were married couples living together, 11.2% had a female householder with no husband present, and 39.0% were non-families. 33.8% of all households were made up of individuals, and 18.1% had someone living alone who was 65 years of age or older.  The average household size was 2.29 and the average family size was 2.79.

In the city, the population was spread out, with 19.2% under the age of 18, 9.4% from 18 to 24, 26.3% from 25 to 44, 21.7% from 45 to 64, and 23.4% who were 65 years of age or older.  The median age was 40 years. For every 100 females, there were 99.1 males.  For every 100 females age 18 and over, there were 93.0 males.

The median income for a household in the city was $26,600, and the median income for a family was $36,164. Males had a median income of $25,823 versus $18,304 for females. The per capita income for the city was $15,977.  About 7.9% of families and 14.6% of the population were below the poverty line, including 14.3% of those under age 18 and 11.2% of those age 65 or over.

Education

Rabun County School District

The Rabun County School District holds pre-school to grade twelve, and consists of two elementary schools, a middle school, and a high school. The district has 140 full-time teachers and over 2,221 students.
Rabun County Elementary School 
Rabun County Primary School
Rabun County Middle School
Rabun County High School

Private education
Rabun Gap-Nacoochee School

Camps
The area around Clayton has long been the location for a number of camps for young people, mostly operated during the summertime.

Camp Ramah Darom is located in the Persimmon Valley northwest of Clayton.
Camp Blue Ridge

Notable people
Mike Ciochetti – stock car racer
Celestia Susannah Parrish – educator, is buried here
John H. Pitchford – lawyer admitted to the bar in Clayton, later moved to Indian Territory, where he became a justice on the Oklahoma Supreme Court on 1923 
Billy Redden – actor who played the young banjo player in the film Deliverance (1972)
Nancy Schaefer – Georgia State Senator
Lillian Smith (1897–1966) – author and civil rights activist

References

External links

 

Cities in Georgia (U.S. state)
Cities in Rabun County, Georgia
Populated places established in 1823
County seats in Georgia (U.S. state)